René Zoungrana (born 18 December 1996) is a Burkinabé football defender who plays for USFA. He was a squad member for the 2020 African Nations Championship.

References

1996 births
Living people
Burkinabé footballers
Burkina Faso international footballers
Burkinabé Premier League players
ASFA Yennenga players
Rail Club du Kadiogo players
US des Forces Armées players
Association football defenders
21st-century Burkinabé people
Burkina Faso A' international footballers
2020 African Nations Championship players